The Royal St George's Golf Club located in Sandwich, Kent, England, is a golf club in the United Kingdom and one of the courses on The Open Championship rotation and is the only Open rota golf course to be located in South East England. It has hosted 15 Open championships, the first in 1894 when it became the first club outside Scotland to host the championship. Past champions include Collin Morikawa, Darren Clarke, Ben Curtis, Greg Norman, Sandy Lyle, Bill Rogers, Bobby Locke, Reg Whitcombe, Henry Cotton, Walter Hagen (on two occasions), Harry Vardon (on two occasions), Jack White and John Henry Taylor. It has also hosted The Amateur Championship on 14 occasions.

The club was founded by the surgeon Laidlaw Purves in 1887 in a setting of wild duneland. Many holes feature blind or partially blind shots, although the unfairness element has been reduced somewhat, after several 20th century modifications. The course also possesses the deepest bunker in championship golf, located on its fourth hole.

The club's Challenge Cup dates from 1888 and is one of the oldest amateur events in golf. It has been contested annually over 36 holes except during the war years. A 19-year-old Jack Nicklaus won the tournament in 1959 shortly before going on to win the first of his two U.S. Amateur titles.

Author Ian Fleming used the Royal St George's course under the name "Royal St. Marks" in his 1959 novel Goldfinger. When he died, Fleming was the Captain-elect of the club.

Environmental awareness
Royal St George's is situated on the same stretch of coastline as Royal Cinque Ports Club and neighbouring Prince's Golf Club, both former Open Championship venues.

The course has been involved in a research informed study undertaken by Dr Graham Earl since 2011, on behalf of Natural England and Canterbury Christ Church University.

The intensive study undertaken between 2011 – 2015 at Sandwich Bay, incorporated all three links golf courses located at Sandwich Bay, including Royal Cinque Ports golf club and Princes golf club. These courses were involved in an Eco-hydrological study, focusing upon the chemical composition of the groundwater, historical analysis of vegetation composition and management trials looking at site-specific management regimes which encourage native sward development.

Management trials indicated that burning as a management regime promoted an increase in native swards. A combination of the research informed outcomes and enthusiasm for the study by Head Greenkeeper Paul Larsen, has helped to revert in a positive way the SSSI status at Royal St Georges golf club, in an unprecedented three-year period.

This burning management regime provides a fast quick burn, therefore not affecting the rooting zone, (in particular the rare orchids which reside predominantly at Sandwich Bay), but does remove the thatch layer removing generalist competitive plant/grass species. The burning treatment, which can be viewed between October and February, was undertaken to reduce the sward thatch and encourage native grey dune plant species and has been very successful. The site now hosts one of the largest abundance of orchids in a single site, managed for amenity.

The Open Championship
Royal St George's has hosted The Open Championship on 15 occasions since 1894.

Note: For multiple winners of The Open Championship, superscript ordinal identifies which in their respective careers.

Scorecard

See also
List of golf clubs granted Royal status

References

External links

Golf Club Atlas Guide
Course Guide at Opengolf
Coverage of 2011 Open on PGA.com
Eco-hydrological interactions within a sand dune system in South East England, CReaTE

Sandwich, Kent
Golf clubs and courses in Kent
The Open Championship venues
Curtis Cup venues
Walker Cup venues
Dover District
1887 establishments in England
Sports venues completed in 1887
Royal golf clubs